Božo Mikulić (born 29 January 1997) is a Croatian footballer who plays for Latvian club Auda.

Career
Apart from his initial two years at NK Omladinac Vranjic, Mikulić spent his entire youth career in RNK Split, becoming a youth international in 2014. As the captain of Split's U19 team, who also handled his team's set-pieces, he was loaned out to the second-tier team NK Imotski where he scored on his senior debut, a 1–1 away draw with NK Dugopolje. In the summer of 2016, he returned to RNK Split and made his Prva HNL debut.

On 31 August 2017, Mikulić signed for Italian club U.C. Sampdoria on a permanent deal.

On 15 June 2018, Mikulić moved to Croatian club Hajduk Split. He made his league debut for the club on 5 August 2018 in a 1-1 home draw with Lokomotiva Zagreb. On 7 August 2019, he joined Slaven Belupo on a season-long loan deal.

On 24 August 2021, he returned to Italy and signed a two-year contract with Serie C club ACR Messina.

On 17 February 2022, Mikulić moved to Auda, newly promoted to Latvian Higher League.

References

External links

1997 births
Living people
Footballers from Split, Croatia
Association football defenders
Croatian footballers
Croatia youth international footballers
RNK Split players
NK Imotski players
U.C. Sampdoria players
HNK Hajduk Split players
HNK Hajduk Split II players
NK Slaven Belupo players
A.C.R. Messina players
FK Auda players
Croatian Football League players
First Football League (Croatia) players
Serie C players
Latvian Higher League players
Croatian expatriate footballers
Expatriate footballers in Italy
Croatian expatriate sportspeople in Italy
Expatriate footballers in Latvia
Croatian expatriate sportspeople in Latvia